Robert James "Bob" Graham (born 13 May 1942) is a former Australian politician.

He was born in Burnie, Tasmania. He was first elected to the Tasmanian House of Assembly in 1980 as a Labor member for Denison, in a recount following Neil Batt's resignation. Defeated in 1982, he returned to the Assembly in 1984 in the recount resulting from John Devine's resignation. He was defeated again in 1986.

References

1942 births
Living people
Members of the Tasmanian House of Assembly
Australian Labor Party members of the Parliament of Tasmania